Borafullerenes are a class of heterofullerenes in which the element substituting for carbon is boron. They are also a member of the boron carbides class of materials that include Tetrabor (B4C).

References

Fullerenes